Weill is an educational institution affiliated with Cornell University, named after Sanford I. Weill and may refer to:
 Weill Institute for Cell and Molecular Biology, research institute located on Cornell University's Ithaca, NY campus
 Weill Medical College of Cornell University, medical school located in New York City
 Weill Cornell Graduate School of Medical Sciences, graduate college for biomedical sciences located in New York City
 Weill Medical College in Qatar, medical school located in Qatar

See also
 Weil (disambiguation)
 Weil (surname), also listing people with the surname "Weill"